Trevor Ian Coker (1 October 1949 – 23 August 1981) was a New Zealand rower who won two Olympic medals. He was born in Whanganui, New Zealand. Coker won the European Championship in 1971. Known then as the "New Zealand Eight", Coker and his team received Halberg Awards in 1971 and 1972 as New Zealand Sportsman of the Year (the rules were altered in 1971 to allow a team to receive this recognition).

Coker was born in Wanganui in 1949. He initially rowed for the Wanganui Rowing Club.

At the 1972 Summer Olympics in Munich, he teamed with Dick Joyce, Wybo Veldman, John Hunter, Lindsay Wilson, Joe Earl, Tony Hurt and Gary Robertson and Simon Dickie (cox) to win the gold medal in the eights. At the 1976 Summer Olympics in Montreal, he again crewed the eight, which this time won the Bronze medal. His crew mates this time were Alec McLean, Ivan Sutherland, Hurt, Peter Dignan, Wilson, Earl and Dave Rodger.

Coker won the New Zealand national championships in the fours in 1974, 1975 and 1976, and with the eights in 1976. He won a bronze medal at the World Championships in 1974, and rowed with the coxed eight in the 1975 World Rowing Championships in Nottingham, Great Britain, winning a bronze medal.

Coker died of a brain tumor in 1981. His teammates stayed close to his wife and son, assisting with financial support. Trevor and the 1972 Gold medal team were inducted into the New Zealand Sports Hall of Fame in 1990. In 1997, the 1972 team travelled back to the course at Munich to mark the 25th anniversary. Coker was the only member not present.

New Zealand secondary school rowing teams compete today for the Coker Memorial Shield.

References

External links
 

1949 births
1981 deaths
New Zealand male rowers
Olympic gold medalists for New Zealand in rowing
Olympic bronze medalists for New Zealand
Rowers at the 1972 Summer Olympics
Rowers at the 1976 Summer Olympics
World Rowing Championships medalists for New Zealand
Medalists at the 1976 Summer Olympics
Medalists at the 1972 Summer Olympics
European Rowing Championships medalists